Nephilengys papuana is a species of araneid spider.

Description

The species was previously included in Nephilengys malabarensis as the subspecies N. m. papuana, but is now recognized as a separate species.

Female body length is about 28 mm, male length 6 mm.

Male spiders apparently self-emasculate after copulation. "At least in Nephilengys, this strategy enables remote copulation, a continuation of sperm transfer after males are detached from copula, which is an additional mechanism to secure eunuch paternity (Li et al. 2012). Although Nephilengys papuana eunuchs have not been subject to experimental testing, early research reported incidents of post-mating emasculation in this species (Robinson and Robinson 1980) and thus its behavior is likely to closely resemble that of its sister species."

Name
The species name is derived from Papua.

Distribution

The species occurs in New Guinea and tropical Australia (Queensland).

Gallery

References

Araneidae
Spiders of Asia
Spiders of Australia
Arthropods of New Guinea
Spiders described in 1881